Tenino is a city in Thurston County, Washington, United States. The population was 1,870 at the 2020 census.

Incorporated in 1906, the city sits upon land first established as a food-source prairie for Native Americans living in the area. The town grew around an economy of stone quarrying, with local sandstone being used in several government and university buildings in the Pacific Northwest. With a decrease in demand for stone, the town converted one abandoned quarry into a community pool. Its downtown district is listed on the National Register of Historic Places.

Tenino gained notoriety during the Great Depression for the use of wooden money as public currency for its residents, a practice briefly revived during the COVID-19 Pandemic. Research released in a 2019 book provided an answer regarding myths surrounding the name of Tenino; it was determined the name is borrowed from the moniker of a steamboat used during a railroad committee expedition.

History
Tenino was officially incorporated on July 24, 1906, though it existed as a rural community since the mid-19th century. Initially, American settlers were attracted to the open prairies created and maintained by local natives through controlled burns to cultivate camas root, a staple food source.  Records indicate the initial settlers' community centered on the prairie approximately 1/2 mile (0.8 km) south of the present town. Early residents named their first post office and school "Coal Bank", in the 1860s, a reference to a nearby coal outcropping.  It was later renamed Tenino.

In the late 19th century, a number of sandstone quarrying companies began shipping building stone, used in many regional buildings outside of Tenino, including the Old Capitol Building and the old Thurston County Courthouse in Olympia, the Mason County Courthouse in Shelton, Washington, the First Congregational Church, developed by Cameron Stone, in Tacoma, Washington, Denny Hall and the Theodore Jacobson Observatory at the University of Washington, Seattle, the Pittock Mansion and the Pioneer Courthouse in Portland, Oregon, the Calvary Presbyterian Church (San Francisco) and several US post office buildings, including at The Dalles, Oregon. The US Government also used stone from these quarries to construct jetties at Westport, Washington and elsewhere.  The quarries declined in the early 20th century when many builders switched to concrete. In addition to quarrying, logging, saw mills, and coal mining were also well established industries in the area.  However, as the timber played out and railroads switched to diesel in the mid-20th century, these industries also declined.

In the years before the construction of Interstate 5, Tenino gained a reputation as a notorious stretch along U.S. Route 99. Many motorists considered it a speed trap because of the strict enforcement by police of the abruptly reduced speed limit through town.

While Tenino retains its historic downtown, now a historic district listed on the National Register of Historic Places, the town serves largely as a "bedroom community", many of its citizens commuting by car to larger cities such as Olympia and Tacoma for work.

Since the mid-1970s, the US Army has used a geographical map of Tenino as a training aid in map reading, because of the variety of symbols represented on the map.

Wooden money

Tenino briefly achieved national notoriety during the Great Depression of the 1930s. After the local bank was closed, the town government temporarily issued wooden money scrip for use by Tenino's residents when cash was scarce. However, most of this wooden money was never redeemed as it became a valuable collector's item.

Tenino began printing the wooden currency again during the COVID-19 recession in 2020, to distribute to the local residents. The revival of the program was approved by the Washington State Auditor and began in May 2020.

Name origin

The origin of the name Tenino, used by the Northern Pacific Railroad for their station when they arrived in 1872, has been debated for over a century. The two main theories given for a century were that Tenino was a Chinook Jargon word for a fork or branch in the trail, or a form of T9o or 10-9-0 used by the railroad for numbering on a locomotive, survey stake, or train car. Both these theories have been disproven for decades, but keep resurfacing because definitive proof of the actual origin was lacking.

Recent research published in The Naming of Tenino by the Tenino City Historian, Richard A Edwards, chronicles the visit of the Pacific Coast Committee in early October 1872. This committee, including Northern Pacific Railroad President Cass, traveled up the Columbia River on steamboats of the Oregon Steam Navigation Company. One of the Oregon Steam Navigation Company's steamboats operating on the upper Columbia and Snake rivers was named the "Tenino". Earlier that year, the Northern Pacific Railroad had purchased controlling interest in the OSN as part of their goal to connect their Kalama to Puget Sound line, then under construction, to their transcontinental railroad being built westward from Minnesota.

On October 12, 1872, at a meeting in Portland, Oregon, shortly after their tour up the Columbia River, John Ainsworth and other officers of the OSN made a presentation about their common interests, President Cass proposed a resolution that also named the momentarily Northern terminus near Hodgden's station "Tenino". As reported the following month in an Olympia, Washington, newspaper, this connection allowed travel from the "old Tenino" (the OSN steamboat which held the record for traveling the farthest east up the Snake River), to "the new town" of Tenino which was the railroad's then current northwest terminus.

In early 1873, the Northern Pacific Railroad and local homesteader Stephen Hodgden filed plats in Thurston county establishing the town of Tenino. By late 1873, the financial backing of the railroad was in financial crisis and their stock in the OSN was sold for debt, ending the railroad's direct connection to the steamboat Tenino. The steamboat Tenino was itself named after the Tenino native band who once lived near The Dalles in Oregon and whose descendants are now part of the Confederated Tribes of Warm Springs.

With the influx of people in Tenino in the 1890s, due to the opening of thriving sandstone quarries, the question of the origin of the name arose. With the steamboat on the distant river gone and long forgotten, locals created mythical stories about its origins. By the early twentieth century, the press were referring to the origin of the name as a mystery.

The name also appears informally as "T-9-O," a shortened variation in use as early as 1873.

Geography
Tenino is located at  (46.856745, -122.850290).

Demographics

2010 census
As of the census of 2010, there were 1,695 people, 691 households, and 440 families residing in the city. The racial makeup of the city was 90.7% White, 0.2% African American, 0.9% Native American, 1.2% Asian, 0.3% Pacific Islander, 2.1% from other races, and 4.6% from two or more races. Hispanic or Latino of any race were 7.4% of the population.

There were 691 households, of which 35.6% had children under the age of 18 living with them, 42.3% were married couples living together, 16.2% had a female householder with no husband present, 5.2% had a male householder with no wife present, and 36.3% were non-families. 28.9% of all households were made up of individuals, and 12.4% had someone living alone who was 65 years of age or older. The average household size was 2.45 and the average family size was 3.01.

The median age in the city was 36.8 years. 25.4% of residents were under the age of 18; 7.6% were between the ages of 18 and 24; 27.1% were from 25 to 44; 26.8% were from 45 to 64; and 13% were 65 years of age or older. The gender makeup of the city was 46.7% male and 53.3% female.

2000 census
As of the census of 2000, there were 1,447 people, 575 households, and 396 families residing in the city. The population density was 1,720.3 people per square mile (665.1/km2). There were 615 housing units at an average density of 731.1 per square mile (282.7/km2). The racial makeup of the city was 90.53% White, 0.83% African American, 1.17% Native American, 3.11% Asian, 0.07% Pacific Islander, 1.94% from other races, and 2.35% from two or more races. Hispanic or Latino of any race were 3.80% of the population.

There were 575 households, out of which 37.7% had children under the age of 18 living with them, 48.7% were married couples living together, 15.7% had a female householder with no husband present, and 31.0% were non-families. 27.3% of all households were made up of individuals, and 13.6% had someone living alone who was 65 years of age or older. The average household size was 2.52 and the average family size was 3.01.

In the city, the age distribution of the population shows 29.8% under the age of 18, 7.6% from 18 to 24, 29.4% from 25 to 44, 18.9% from 45 to 64, and 14.3% who were 65 years of age or older. The median age was 34 years. For every 100 females, there were 91.4 males. For every 100 females age 18 and over, there were 89.2 males.

The median income for a household in the city was $34,526, and the median income for a family was $41,208. Males had a median income of $31,058 versus $25,972 for females. The per capita income for the city was $18,244. About 5.0% of families and 9.1% of the population were below the poverty line, including 12.4% of those under age 18 and 9.9% of those age 65 or over.

Arts and Culture

Inspired by a mayoral proclamation in 1968 for Tenino to honor pioneer history and culture, the city began holding an annual weekend "Oregon Trail Days" festival.  Demonstrations of logging, blacksmithing, railroad work, and pioneer home life often highlight the event.  "Black powder shoots", historical exhibits, live music, cuisine, vintage car shows, and a parade round out the celebration. Several other organizations, such as the local farmer's market and rock-and-gem shows, will often hold events concurrently throughout the city.

In 2020, Tenino created the "Tenino Creative Arts District" by certification thru the Washington state Arts Commission. The area, designated as including the historic downtown, business district, and the entirety of Tenino City Park, is projected to include public art of various mediums, including murals and metal banners and signs depicting Tenino's history. A scavenger hunt is to be based on the artworks.

Parks and recreation

The city contains 50 acres of parks. The largest, Tenino City Park, sits south of the center of town, with the Yelm–Rainier-Tenino Trail crossing through the area. The park contains the Tenino Stone Quarry community pool, the renovated Quarry House, and the Tenino Depot Museum, along with various ballfields and picnic areas. A supplemental appropriation of over $500,000 was awarded to the city in 2022 for the rebuild of the park's playground after damage from a winter storm the prior year.

Historic buildings and structures

There are 26 historic sites in or near Tenino. Following are some of those properties.

See also
 Wolf Haven International
 Yelm–Tenino Trail
 Monarch Contemporary Art Center and Sculpture Park

References

External links

 City of Tenino

 
Cities in Thurston County, Washington
Cities in Washington (state)